John Halliday Cross (12 February 1881 – 1954) was a Scottish professional footballer who made over 190 appearances in the Scottish League for Third Lanark over two spells, winning the league title in 1903–04 and playing in the 1906 Scottish Cup Final. He also played for Petershill, Queens Park Rangers and Wishaw Thistle and won one cap for Scotland at international level, in addition to representing the Scottish League XI. He was the brother of fellow Third Lanark and QPR footballer Willie Cross.

References

Sources

External links

London Hearts profile

1881 births
1954 deaths
Scottish footballers
Scotland international footballers
Association football wing halves
Third Lanark A.C. players
Queens Park Rangers F.C. players
Wishaw Thistle F.C. players
Petershill F.C. players
Scottish Football League players
Scottish Junior Football Association players
Scottish Football League representative players
Southern Football League players
Date of death missing
People from Cambusnethan
Sportspeople from Wishaw
Footballers from North Lanarkshire